A microclimate (or micro-climate) is a local set of atmospheric conditions that differ from those in the surrounding areas, often slightly but sometimes substantially. The term may refer to areas as small as a few square meters or smaller (for example a garden bed, underneath a rock, or a cave) or as large as many square kilometers. Because climate is statistical, which implies spatial and temporal variation of the mean values of the describing parameters, within a region there can occur and persist over time sets of statistically distinct conditions, that is, microclimates. Microclimates can be found in most places but are most pronounced in topographically dynamic zones such as mountainous areas, islands, and coastal areas.

Microclimates exist, for example, near bodies of water which may cool the local atmosphere, or in heavy urban areas where brick, concrete, and asphalt absorb the sun's energy, heat up, and re-radiate that heat to the ambient air: the resulting urban heat island (UHI) is a kind of microclimate that is additionally driven by relative paucity of vegetation.

Background

The terminology "micro-climate" first appeared in the 1950s in publications such as Climates in Miniature: A Study of Micro-Climate Environment (Thomas Bedford Franklin, 1955).

Examples of microclimates
The area in a developed industrial park may vary greatly from a wooded park nearby, as natural flora in parks absorb light and heat in leaves that a building roof or parking lot just radiates back into the air. Advocates of solar energy argue that widespread use of solar collection can mitigate overheating of urban environments by absorbing sunlight and putting it to work instead of heating the foreign surface objects.

A microclimate can offer an opportunity as a small growing region for crops that cannot thrive in the broader area; this concept is often used in permaculture practiced in northern temperate climates. Microclimates can be used to the advantage of gardeners who carefully choose and position their plants. Cities often raise the average temperature by zoning, and a sheltered position can reduce the severity of winter. Roof gardening, however, exposes plants to more extreme temperatures in both summer and winter.

In an urban area, tall buildings create their own microclimate, both by overshadowing large areas and by channeling strong winds to ground level. Wind effects around tall buildings are assessed as part of a microclimate study.

Microclimates can also refer to purpose-made environments, such as those in a room or other enclosure. Microclimates are commonly created and carefully maintained in museum display and storage environments. This can be done using passive methods, such as silica gel, or with active microclimate control devices.

Usually, if the inland areas have a humid continental climate, the coastal areas stay much milder during winter months, in contrast to the hotter summers. This is the case in places such as British Columbia, where Vancouver has an oceanic wet winter with rare frosts, but inland areas that average several degrees warmer in summer have cold and snowy winters.

Sources and influences on microclimate
Two main parameters to define a microclimate within a certain area are temperature and humidity. A source of a drop in temperature and/or humidity can be attributed to different sources or influences.
Often a microclimate is shaped by a conglomerate of different influences and is a subject of microscale meteorology.

Cold air pool
Examples of the cold air pool (CAP) effect are Gstettneralm Sinkhole in Austria (lowest recorded temperature ) and Peter Sinks in the US.
The main criterion on the wind speed  in order to create a warm air flow penetration into a CAP is the following:

where  is the Froude number,  — the Brunt–Väisälä frequency,  — depth of the valley, and  — Froude number at the threshold wind speed.

Craters
The presence of permafrost close to the surface in a crater creates a unique microclimate environment.

Caves
Caves are important geologic formations that can house unique and delicate geologic/biological environments. The vast majority of caves found are made of calcium carbonates such as limestone(see Cave and Limestone). In these dissolution environments, many species of flora and fauna find home. The mixture of water content within the cave atmosphere, air pressure, geochemistry of the cave rock as well as the waste product from these species can combine to make unique microclimates within cave systems. 
 
The speleogenetic effect is an observed and studied process of air circulation within cave environments brought on by convection.  In phreatic conditions the cave surfaces are exposed to the enclosed air(as opposed to submerged and interacting with water from the water table in vadose conditions). This air circulates water particles that condense on cave walls and formations such as speleothems.  This condensing water has been found to contribute to cave wall erosion and the formation of morphological features. Some examples of this can be found in the limestone walls of Grotta Giusti; a thermal cave near Monsummano, Lucca, Italy. Any process that leads to an increase or decrease in chemical/physical processes will subsequently impact the environment within that system.  Air density within caves, which directly relates to the convection processes, is determined by the air temperature, humidity, and pressure. In enclosed cave environments, the introduction of bacteria, algae, plants, animals, or human interference can change any one of these factors therefore altering the microenvironment within the cave. There are over 750 caves worldwide that are available for people to visit.  The constant human traffic through these cave environments can have a negative effect on the microclimates as well as on the geological and archeological findings. Factors that play into the deterioration of these environments include nearby deforestation, agriculture operations, water exploitation, mining, and tourist operations. 

The speleogenetic effect of normal caves tends to show a slow circulation of air. In unique conditions where acids are present, the effects of erosion and changes to the microenvironment can be drastically enhanced.  One example is the effect of the presence of hydrosulfuric acid(). When the oxidized hydrosulfuric acid chemically alters to sulfuric acid(), this acid starts to react with the calcium carbonate rock at much higher rates.  The water involved in this reaction tends to have a high pH of 3 which renders the water almost unlivable for many bacteria and algae.  An example of this can be found in the Grotta Grande del Vento cave in Ancona, Italy.

Plant microclimate
As pointed out by Rudolf Geiger in his book not only climate influences the living plant but the opposite effect of the interaction of plants on their environment can also take place, and is known as plant climate. This effect has important consequences for forests in the midst of a continent; indeed, if forests were not creating their own clouds and water cycle with their efficient evapotranspiration activity, there would be no forest far away from coasts, as statistically, without any other influence, rainfall occurrence would decrease from the coast towards inland. Planting trees to fight drought has also been proposed in the context of afforestation.

Dams

Artificial reservoirs as well as natural ones create microclimates and often influence the macroscopic climate as well.

Slopes 
Another contributing factor of microclimate is the slope or aspect of an area. South-facing slopes in the Northern Hemisphere and north-facing slopes in the Southern Hemisphere are exposed to more direct sunlight than opposite slopes and are therefore warmer for longer periods of time, giving the slope a warmer microclimate than the areas around the slope. The lowest area of a glen may sometimes frost sooner or harder than a nearby spot uphill, because cold air sinks, a drying breeze may not reach the lowest bottom, and humidity lingers and precipitates, then freezes.

Soil types
The type of soil found in an area can also affect microclimates. For example, soils heavy in clay can act like pavement, moderating the near ground temperature. On the other hand, if soil has many air pockets, then the heat could be trapped underneath the topsoil, resulting in the increased possibility of frost at ground level.

Cities and regions known for microclimates

Americas
 Northern California above the Bay Area is also well known for microclimates with significant differences of temperatures. Even as far north as the Klamath River valley around the 41st parallel north between Willow Creek and Eureka averages such temperatures, which is extremely hot for such northerly areas. At this parallel, the temperature at the coast is so cool that Willow Creek beats Eureka's all-time record temperature on average 79 times per year. In oceanic stable terms it is like traveling from the summers in the north of England to the south of Spain in a fraction of the distance.
 San Francisco is a city with microclimates and sub microclimates. Due to the city's varied topography and influence from the prevailing summer marine layer, weather conditions can vary by as much as 9 °F (5 °C) from block to block. The Noe Valley district for example, is typically warmer and sunnier than adjacent areas because the surrounding hills block some of the cool fog from the Pacific.
 The region as a whole, known as the San Francisco Bay Area can have a wide range of extremes in temperature. In the basins and valleys adjoining the coast, climate is subject to wide variations within short distances as a result of the influence of topography on the circulation of marine air. The San Francisco Bay Area offers many varieties of climate within a few miles.
 The Los Angeles and San Diego areas are also subject to phenomena typical of a microclimate. The temperatures can vary as much as ) between inland areas and the coast, with a temperature gradient of over one degree per mile (1.6 km) from the coast inland. Hills and mountains can also block coastal air masses. The San Fernando Valley is usually much warmer in summer than most of Los Angeles, because the Santa Monica Mountains usually block the cool ocean breezes and fog. Southern California has also a weather phenomenon called "June Gloom" or "May Grey", which sometimes gives overcast or foggy skies in the morning at the coast, but usually gives sunny skies by noon, during late spring and early summer.
 Calgary, Alberta, is also known for its microclimates. Especially notable are the differences between the downtown and river valley/flood plain regions and the areas to the west and north.
 Halifax, Nova Scotia, also has numerous microclimates. This is true in all seasons. Varying elevations are common throughout the city, and it is even possible to experience several microclimates while traveling on a single highway due to these changing elevations.
 Vancouver and its metro area also has many microclimates. Temperatures in the Fraser Valley inland may be up to 10 °C (18 °F) warmer than the coast, while in winter they are several degrees colder.
 Chesapeake Bay is also known for its subtropical microclimate. It is most notable for its mild climatic effects on the area east and west of the lowlands of Maryland and Delmarva. An example of this effect is the survival of tropical palm trees and plants such as water hyacinths in the area.
 Chile Chico and Los Antiguos on the southern shores of General Carrera Lake have favourable conditions for agriculture despite being in inner Patagonia.
New York City and its surrounding metro area feature a mega urban heat island, and influence from the Atlantic ocean. These factors cause it to be the northernmost major city with a subtropical climate, with the city being in the 7a/7b/8a usda zones, compared to nearby cities south of it, which feature lower zones.

Europe
 Known for its wines, the Ticino region in Switzerland benefits from a microclimate in which palm trees and banana trees grow.
 Gran Canaria is called "Miniature Continent" for its rich variety of microclimates.
 Tenerife is known for its wide variety of microclimates.
 Biddulph Grange is very rich with microclimates as a result of the large dips and variety of very large trees alongside a large amount of water.
 Leeds, located in Yorkshire, England, is known to have a number of microclimates because of the number of valleys surrounding the city centre.
 The central west coast of Portugal, similarly to California, has huge differences in summer temperatures from the surrounding inland regions. This phenomenon is caused by local upwelling created by the northern Nortada winds.
 The coastal areas in the Andalusia region of Spain has a microclimate.
 Sorana, a commune in Italy's Pescia Valley with a microclimate considered ideal for growing the Sorana bean.

Asia and Oceania
 Istanbul exhibits a multitude of distinct microclimates because of its hilly topography and maritime influences. Furthermore, while the city itself lies in USDA hardiness zones 9a to 9b, its inland suburbs lie in zone 8b with isolated pockets of zone 8a, restricting the cultivation of cold-hardy subtropical plants to the coasts.
 Amman, Jordan, has extreme examples of microclimate, and almost every neighbourhood exhibits its own weather. It is known among locals that some boroughs such as the northern and western suburbs are among the coldest in the city, and can be experiencing frost or snow whilst other warmer districts such as the city centre can be at much warmer temperatures at the same time.
 Yazd and Kashan in Iran, the traditional architecture benefits from central courtyards with trees and water pools that function together with wind catchers to create a favorable microclimate in this desert area.
 Sydney, Australia, has a microclimate occurring prominently in the warmer months. However, winter lows in the West are around  cooler than the coastal suburbs, and may provide mild to moderate frost.

See also
 Climate categories in viticulture
 Cities for Climate Protection program
 Mesonet and micronet
 Regional climate levels in viticulture
 Terroir

References

External links

 Trends in Microclimate Control of Museum Display Cases

Agronomy
Regional climate effects